Hampl is a Czech surname derived from the German surname Hampel. Notable people with the surname include:

Patricia Hampl (born 1946), American writer
Václav Hampl (born 1962), Czech physiologist
Zbyněk Hampl (born 1988), Czech ice hockey player

Czech-language surnames